The Vampire Diaries is an American supernatural-fantasy horror television series. The series is based on a book series of the same name by L.J. Smith and was developed for television by Kevin Williamson and Julie Plec. The series ran from September 10, 2009, to March 10, 2017, on The CW. The first season was released on both DVD and Blu-ray formats in the United States and Canada on August 31, 2010.

The Vampire Diaries follows the life of Elena Gilbert (Nina Dobrev) who lives in Mystic Falls, a fictional town heavily charged with supernatural history. She falls for a handsome century-old vampire named Stefan Salvatore (Paul Wesley). Their lives grow more and more complicated as Stefan's vicious older vampire brother Damon Salvatore (Ian Somerhalder) also returns to town with a vendetta against his brother and the descendants of the town's founders. However, Damon quickly becomes their greatest ally in their fight against evil.

Series overview

Episodes

Season 1 (2009–10)

Season 2 (2010–11)

Season 3 (2011–12)

Season 4 (2012–13)

Season 5 (2013–14)

Season 6 (2014–15)

Season 7 (2015–16)

Season 8 (2016–17)

Specials

Ratings

References

External links
 
 

Lists of American fantasy television series episodes
Lists of American horror-supernatural television series episodes